This page documents all tornadoes confirmed by various weather forecast offices of the National Weather Service in the United States from April to June 1954.  Further discussion can be found at Tornadoes of 1954.

Confirmed tornadoes
In addition to confirmed tornadoes, the Climatological Data National Summary listed the following, which are not officially listed as tornadoes:
A tornado destroyed a shed at Letchworth, in Prairie County, Arkansas, at 18:30 UTC on April 30.

April 25 event

April 26 event

April 27 event

April 28 event

April 29 event

April 30 event

Notes

References

Sources

1954-related lists
Tornadoes of 1954
1954 natural disasters in the United States
Tornadoes in the United States
1954 meteorology
Lists of tornadoes in the United States by time